Turkey participated in the Eurovision Song Contest 2012 with the song "Love Me Back" written and performed by Can Bonomo. The entry was selected through an internal selection organised by Turkish broadcaster Türkiye Radyo ve Televizyon Kurumu (TRT). Turkey qualified from the second semi-final of the Eurovision Song Contest and went on to place seventh in the final out of the 26 participating countries, scoring 112 points.

, this was the last Turkish entry in the contest, before the country withdrew the following year. The absence has continued in every edition since.

Before Eurovision

Internal selection 
On 22 September 2011, TRT opened the suggestions for the public to nominate potential artists for consideration. On 9 January 2012, TRT announced during the TRT 1 evening news bulletin that singer Can Bonomo had been internally selected to represent Turkey in Baku. Prior to the announcement of Can Bonomo as the Turkish representative, rumoured artists in Turkish media included Atiye, Hande Yener, Kıraç and Sıla. Three songs were submitted by Bonomo to the broadcaster in February 2012 and a selection committee selected "Love Me Back" as the song they would perform at the contest.

On 22 February 2012, "Love Me Back" was presented to the public during a television special which took place at the TRT Tepebaşı Studios in Istanbul, hosted by Işık Özden and Husniyya Maharramova. The show was broadcast on TRT 1 and TRT Müzik as well as online via the broadcaster's official website trt.net.tr and the official Eurovision Song Contest website eurovision.tv. The song was written by Can Bonomo himself.

At Eurovision
Turkey competed in the second half of the second semi-final (13th on stage), on 24 May 2012, following Georgia and preceding Estonia. Can Bonomo received 80 points and placed 5th, thus qualifying for the final on 26 May. The public awarded Turkey 4th place with 114 points and the jury awarded 13th place with 42 points.

In the final, Turkey was drawn to perform 18th, after Sweden and preceding Spain. The Turkish entry scored a total of 112 points and placed 7th in the final, with the public awarding Turkey 4th place with 176 points and the jury awarding 22nd place with 50 points.

Voting

Points awarded to Turkey

Points awarded by Turkey

References

2012
Countries in the Eurovision Song Contest 2012
Eurovision